Giorgio Stegani (13 October 1928 – 20 February 2020) was an Italian film and television writer, film director and second unit director.

Stegani was best known for his western films of the 1960s. He wrote the script for westerns such as Un Dollaro bucato (1965), directed and wrote Adiós gringo in 1965 and co-wrote Mille dollari sul nero (1966).

Selected filmography
 Golden Chameleon (1967)
 Beyond the Law (1968)

External links and sources

References

1928 births
2020 deaths
Italian film directors
Italian screenwriters
Italian male screenwriters
Spaghetti Western directors